Last Shop Standing may refer to:
 Last Shop Standing (book), a 2009 book by Graham Jones
 Last Shop Standing (film), a 2012 British documentary film based on the book